Ivan Petrovych Kotliarevsky ( in Poltava –  in Poltava, Russian Empire, now Ukraine) was a Ukrainian writer, poet and playwright, social activist, regarded as the pioneer of modern Ukrainian literature. Kotliarevsky was a veteran of the Russo-Turkish War.

Biography 
Kotliarevsky was born in the Ukrainian city of Poltava in the family of a clerk Petro Kotliarevsky of Ogończyk Coat of Arms. After studying at the Poltava Theological Seminary (1780–1789), he worked as a tutor for the gentry at rural estates, where he became familiar with Ukrainian folk life and the peasant vernacular. He served in the Imperial Russian Army between 1796 and 1808 in the Siversky Karabiner Regiment. Kotliarevsky participated in the Russo-Turkish War (1806–1812) as a staff-captain (something of 1LT or junior CPT) during which the Russian troops laid the siege to the city of Izmail. In 1808 he retired from the Army. In 1810 he became the trustee of an institution for the education of children of impoverished nobles. In 1812, during the French invasion of Imperial Russia he organized the 5th Ukrainian Cossack Regiment in the town of Horoshyn (Khorol uyezd, Poltava Governorate) under the condition that it will be left after the war as a permanent military formation. For that he received a rank of major.

He helped stage theatrical productions at the Poltava governor-general's residence and was the artistic director of the Poltava Free Theater between 1812 and 1821. In 1818 together with Vasyl Lukashevych, V. Taranovsky, and others he was the member of the Poltava Freemasonry Lodge The Love for Truth. Kotliarevsky participated in the buyout of Mikhail Shchepkin out of the serfdom. From 1827 to 1835 he directed several philanthropic agencies.

The first modern Ukrainian writer 

Ivan Kotliarevsky's mock-heroic 1798 poem Eneida, is considered to be the first literary work published wholly in the modern Ukrainian language. It is a loose translation of an earlier poem  published in 1791 by the Russian poet N. P. Osipov, but his text is absolutely different. In 1845  wrote a Belarusian version of "" in Russian magazine "Mayak". Although Ukrainian was an everyday language to millions of people in Ukraine, it was officially discouraged from literary use in the area controlled by Imperial Russia. Eneida is a parody of Virgil's Aeneid, where Kotliarevsky transformed the Trojan heroes into Zaporozhian Cossacks. Critics believe that it was written in the light of the destruction of Zaporizhian Host by the order of Catherine the Great.

His two plays, also living classics, Natalka Poltavka (Natalka from Poltava) and Moskal-Charivnyk (The Muscovite-Sorcerer), became the impetus for the creation of the Natalka Poltavka opera and the development of Ukrainian national theater.

Legacy 
 The Kharkiv I. P. Kotlyarevsky National University of Arts, in Kharkiv, Ukraine, is named after him.
 Monument to Kotliarevsky was erected by Fedir Lyzohub in Poltava
 Numerous boulevards and streets in Ukrainian cities are named after the poet, the largest ones being in Kyiv, Poltava, Chernihiv, Vinnytsia, Khmelnytsky, Chernivtsi, Pryluky, Lubny and Berdychiv.

English translation 
Partial translations of Eneida date back to 1933 when a translation of first few stanzas of Kotliarevsky's Eneida by Wolodymyr Semenyna was published in the American newspaper of Ukrainian diaspora Ukrainian Weekly on 20 October 1933. However, the first full English translation of Kotliarevsky's magnum opus Eneida was published only in 2006 in Canada by a Ukrainian-Canadian Bohdan Melnyk, most well known for his English translation of Ivan Franko's Ukrainian fairy tale Mykyta the Fox.

List of English translations:
Ivan Kotliarevsky. Aeneid: [Translated into English from Ukrainian by Bohdan Melnyk]. — Canada, Toronto: The Basilian Press, 2004. — 278 pages. .

References

External links

Ivan Kotlyarevsky: Ukrainian author in Encyclopædia Britannica
Kotliarevsky, Ivan in Encyclopedia of Ukraine
Works by Ivan Kotliarevsky for reading online in Ukrainian
Eneyida: a living classic of Ukrainian literature in Welcome to Ukraine, 1999, 1
 Excerpts from Ivan Kotliarevsky, Eneida (translated into English)
 Text of Eneida 

Ukrainian humorists
1769 births
1838 deaths
Writers from Poltava
Ukrainian Freemasons
Ukrainian nobility
Russian people of the Napoleonic Wars
Ukrainian poets
Ukrainian male writers
Ukrainian satirists
Ukrainian dramatists and playwrights